Árnafjørður is a town of the municipality of Klaksvík, on the island of Borðoy, in the Faroe Islands. 

Árnafjørður is located at the bottom of a deep inlet, named (H)Árnfjarðarvík, "corner fjord's bay", on the east side of Borðoy. In 1875, an abandoned Norwegian vessel loaded with large amounts of timber drifted ashore at Árnafjørður. The timber was sold at an auction and, because of the sudden surplus, the price for timber decreased significantly. Timber has always been expensive in the Faroes as, other than driftwood, it usually has to be imported.

See also
 List of towns in the Faroe Islands

References

External links

Faroeislands.dk: Árnafjørdur Images and description of all cities on the Faroe Islands.

Populated places in the Faroe Islands